The Silent Watcher is a lost 1924 American silent melodrama film directed by Frank Lloyd. It stars Glenn Hunter and Bessie Love. It was produced by Frank Lloyd Productions/First National and distributed by First National Pictures. It was based on the story "The Altar on the Hill" by Mary Roberts Rinehart.

Plot 
A lawyer (Bosworth) running for Congress decides to end his relationship with a showgirl (Bennett), so that he will be more presentable candidate. When the showgirl commits suicide, the police arrest the lawyer for murder. The lawyer's young secretary (Hunter) decides to take the blame for his employer by saying that he was the one in a relationship with the showgirl. However, this upsets his new bride (Love), who leaves him. The secretary is cleared of guilt when the truth of the showgirl's death is made known, but decides to commit suicide himself because he no longer has the woman he loves. As a final act of love, he cleans their home, when he is interrupted by her return, and the news that his former employer has been elected to Congress.

Cast

Release and reception 
Stills of Alma Bennett's dance number featured prominently in the promotion of the film. On its release, it was shown in some theaters with the Mack Sennett comedy The Wild Goose Chaser, as well as The Color World. Other theaters showed the film with the comedy Turn About.

Glenn Hunter and Bessie Love received high praise for their performances, as did the screenplay. Although the film itself was deemed tedious in parts, the overall reviews were overwhelmingly positive.

See also 
 Gertrude Astor filmography

References

External links

 
 
 
 Advertising for the film

1924 drama films
1924 lost films
1924 films
American black-and-white films
Silent American drama films
American silent feature films
Films directed by Frank Lloyd
Films based on short fiction
Films based on works by Mary Roberts Rinehart
First National Pictures films
Lost American films
Lost drama films
Melodrama films
1920s American films